"Alone Too Long" is a 1975 single by Hall & Oates from their album Daryl Hall & John Oates. The song features John Oates on lead vocals, and reached number 98 on the Billboard R&B chart in 1975.

Record World called it "a high harmonied track" and "a most pleasing and sensuous effort."

The song is used as the opening theme to the 2013 HBO comedy series Hello Ladies starring Stephen Merchant.

References

Songs written by John Oates
Hall & Oates songs
1975 singles
1975 songs
RCA Records singles